The following is a list of hospitals in Colombo District, Sri Lanka. The biggest government hospitals in the district, known as line ministry hospitals, are controlled by the  central government in Colombo. All other government hospitals in the district are controlled by the provincial government in Colombo.

Government hospitals

Central government hospitals

National hospital
 National Hospital of Sri Lanka, Colombo

Teaching hospitals
 Castle Street Hospital for Women, Colombo
 Colombo South Teaching Hospital, Kalubowila
 Dental Institute, Colombo
 De Soysa Hospital for Women (De Soysa Maternity Hospital), Colombo
 Lady Ridgeway Hospital for Children, Colombo
 National Cancer Institute, Maharagama
 National Eye Hospital, Colombo
 National Institute of Mental Health (Angoda Mental Hospital), Angoda
 Sri Jayawardenepura General Hospital, Sri Jayawardenepura

Base hospitals (type A)
 Infectious Disease Hospital (Fever Hospital), Angoda

Base hospitals (type B)
 Mulleriyawa Base Hospital (Colombo East General Hospital), Mulleriyawa

Other central government hospitals
 Borella Prison Hospital, Borella
 Colombo Military Hospital, Colombo
 Colomb Naval Hospital, SLNS Parakrama, Colombo
 Panagoda Base Hospital, Panagoda Cantonment
 Police Hospital, Colombo

Provincial government hospitals

Base hospitals (type A)
 Avissawella Base Hospital, Avissawella
 Homagama Base Hospital, Homagama

Divisional hospitals (type A)
 Piliyandala Divisional Hospital, Piliyandala
 Wetara District Hospital, Polgasowita

Divisional hospitals (type B)
 Koswatta Divisional Hospital, Thalangama
 Moratuwa District Hospital, Moratuwa
 Padukka Divisional Hospital, Padukka

Divisional hospitals (type C)
 Maligawatta District Hospital (Premadasa Memorial Hospital), Maligawatta
 Kosgama Divisional Hospital, Salawa

Private hospitals
 Asiri Hospital, Colombo
 Durdans Hospital, Colombo
 Nawaloka Hospital, Colombo
 Lanka Hospitals, Colombo
 Hemas Hospital, Thalawathugoda
 Kings Hospital, Colombo
 Neville Fernando Teaching Hospital, Malabe
 Vasana Hospital, Dehiwala, Colombo
 Pannipitiya Private Hospital, Pannipitiya
 Santa Dora Hospital, Battaramulla
 The Singapore Clinic for Dialysis
 Sulaiman's Hospital (Grandpass Maternity & Nursing Home)
 Vasan Eye Care Hospital, Colombo
 Western Hospital, Colombo
Suwasarana Medicare Homoeopathic treatment  Pugoda Road Dekatana
 Inter National Research Institute of Homoeopathy  Ramakrishnan street  Colombo
German Treatment centre  Station Road Ja-eka

See also
 List of hospitals in Sri Lanka

References

 
 
 

Colombo
Colombo